The Elephant Cays are a group of small islands lying towards the southern end of Falkland Sound, just to the north-west of Speedwell Island, in the Falkland Islands of the South Atlantic Ocean.  The group, with a collective area of 248 ha includes Golden Knob, Sandy Cay, West, Southwest and Stinker Islands.  It has been identified by BirdLife International as an Important Bird Area (IBA).

Description
The islands have good tussac cover, but are not well known. Some may have been occasionally stocked with cattle in the 1930s and 1940s, and  Stinker Island was grazed until 1985.

Birds
Birds for which the site is of conservation significance include Magellanic penguins and striated caracaras.  The group is also the most important breeding site in the world for southern giant petrels, of which there are about 11,000 pairs.  There are also two small colonies of imperial shags.

References

Islands of the Falkland Islands
Important Bird Areas of the Falkland Islands
Seabird colonies